Léchelles railway station is a railway station in the municipality of Belmont-Broye, in the Swiss canton of Fribourg. It is an intermediate stop on the standard gauge Fribourg–Yverdon line of Swiss Federal Railways.

Services
The following services stop at Léchelles:

References

External links 
 
 

Railway stations in the canton of Fribourg
Swiss Federal Railways stations